Maryna Viktorivna Nikitina (born 16 April 1986) is a Ukrainian politician currently serving as a People's Deputy of Ukraine representing Ukraine's 82nd electoral district as a member of Servant of the People since 2019. Prior to her election, she was a lawyer.

Early life and career 
Maryna Viktorivna Nikitina was born on 16 April 1986 in the city of Huliaipole, in Ukraine's southern Zaporizhzhia Oblast. She graduated from the Classic Private University in 2009, specialising in jurisprudence. She worked as a lawyer at Preobrazhene TOV from 2009 to 2013 before resigning to work as a lawyer voluntarily.

Political career 
During the 2019 Ukrainian presidential election, she was involved in the campaign of Volodymyr Zelenskyy.

In the 2019 Ukrainian parliamentary election, Nikitina was the candidate of Servant of the People for People's Deputy of Ukraine in Ukraine's 82nd electoral district. At the time of the election, she was an independent. She was successfully elected, winning the election with 40.43% of the vote. Her next-closest competitor, independent incumbent , gathered 20.96% of the vote.

In the Verkhovna Rada (Ukraine's parliament), Nikitina joined the Servant of the People faction, as well as the Verkhovna Rada Committee on Agricultural and Land Policies and the Equal Opportunities inter-factional association. During her tenure as a People's Deputy, Nikitina has been found guilty of corruption and forced to pay a fine of ₴3,400 for hiring her husband as an assistant with a salary of ₴24,000. Nikitina has also been criticised by anti-corruption non-governmental organisation Chesno for voting in favour of a bill on urban planning reform, which Chesno claims will place control over reconstruction following the 2022 Russian invasion of Ukraine in the hands of developers.

References 

1986 births
Living people
Ninth convocation members of the Verkhovna Rada
Servant of the People (political party) politicians
Women members of the Verkhovna Rada